Calocarcelia is a genus of bristle flies in the family Tachinidae.

Species
Calocarcelia amazonica (Townsend, 1934)
Calocarcelia aureocephala Thompson 1964
Calocarcelia fasciata Townsend, 1927
Calocarcelia minima Thompson 1964
Calocarcelia orellana Townsend, 1929
Calocarcelia trinitatis Thompson 1964

References

Diptera of North America
Diptera of South America
Exoristinae
Tachinidae genera
Taxa named by Charles Henry Tyler Townsend